The men's 100 metres event at the 1963 Pan American Games was held at the Pacaembu Stadium in São Paulo on 27 and 28 April.

Medalists

Results

Heats

Final

References

Athletics at the 1963 Pan American Games
1963